Jang Ali (جنگ‌علی) is a village in Baghlan Province in north eastern Afghanistan.

See also 
Baghlan Province

References

External links
Satellite map at Maplandia.com

Populated places in Baghlan Province